Eucalyptus neglecta, commonly known as Omeo gum, is a species of small tree that is endemic to a small area of Victoria, Australia. Older plants have rough, fibrous bark on the trunk, otherwise smooth grey to brownish bark, a crown of mostly lance-shaped, egg-shaped or oblong leaves arranged in opposite pairs, flower buds in groups of between seven and fifteen, white flowers and cup-shaped or conical fruit.

Description
It has smooth grey to brownish bark, but older specimens often have fibrous grey to brown bark on the trunk. The crown of the tree is mostly composed of sessile, juvenile leaves that are arranged in opposite pairs, with some intermediate and adult leaves. Flowering occurs between November and February and the flowers are white.

Taxonomy and naming
Eucalyptus neglecta was first formally described in 1904 by Joseph Maiden in The Victorian Naturalist from specimens collected near Omeo by Alfred William Howitt. The specific epithet (neglecta) is from the Latin neglectus meaning "neglected", apparently because the species was not recognised as distinct at first.

Distribution and habitat
Omeo gum grows on river flats along creeks in the Victorian high country, including near Omeo and Bright. Although rare, it is easily recognised because of the unusual foliage in its crown.

See also
List of Eucalyptus species

References

Trees of Australia
neglecta
Myrtales of Australia
Flora of Victoria (Australia)
Plants described in 1904
Taxa named by Joseph Maiden